Pectoral nerve may refer to:

 Lateral pectoral nerve
 Medial pectoral nerve